Caryocolum jaspidella is a moth of the family Gelechiidae. It is found in Portugal, Spain and Algeria.

The length of the forewings is 4–5 mm. The forewings are mid- to dark brown mottled with white, particularly near the base and across the middle. Adults have been recorded on wing in late August.

References

Moths described in 1908
jaspidella
Moths of Europe
Moths of Africa